Jean-Marie Durand (13 November 1940) is a French Assyriologist.

Career 
A student of the École Normale Supérieure (Lettres 1962), agrégé of grammar (1965), Doctor of History following a thesis dedicated to the documents of the rooms 134 and 160 of the Royal Palace of Mari (1975), Jean-Marie Durand was "directeur d'études" at the École pratique des hautes études (IVth section, Sumerian and Akkadian Antiques) (1987–1997) and professor at the Collège de France, holder of the chair of Assyriology (1999–2011) where he succeeded Paul Garelli.

He largely devoted his research to the study of texts found in the ruins of the ancient city of Mari, and the publication of the Royal Archives of Mari.

Durand was elected a member of the Académie des inscriptions et belles-lettres 1 March 2013, at Emmanuel Poulle's seat.

As of 2016, Jean-Marie Durand is editor in chief of the Journal Asiatique.

Selected works 
 1981: Textes babyloniens d'époque récente
 1996: Amurru 1
 1997: Les documents épistolaires du palais de Mari
 1998: Les documents épistolaires du palais de Mari Tome II

Bibliography 
 (Article) « Les premiers médecins en Mésopotamie : l’exemple de Mari ». In Comptes rendus de l'Académie des inscriptions et belles-lettres, n°4, 2006. pp. 1827–1834 Online 
 (Article) « Zimrî-Lîm achète la ville d’Alahtum ». In : Comptes rendus des séances de l’Académie des Inscriptions et Belles-Lettres, n°1, 2002. pp. 11–30. Online

References

External links 
 Bibliothèque d'Assyriologie, archives du site du Collège de France.

1940 births
Living people
École Normale Supérieure alumni
Academic staff of the École pratique des hautes études
Academic staff of the Collège de France
Members of the Académie des Inscriptions et Belles-Lettres
French Assyriologists
Chevaliers of the Légion d'honneur
Commandeurs of the Ordre des Palmes Académiques
Assyriologists